Following are the disciplines in which Cambridge International Examinations (CIE) of Cambridge Assessment (UCLES) offers General Certificate of Education (GCE) Advanced Level and/or Advanced Subsidiary Level (AS/A Level) qualifications:

See also
 University of Cambridge International Examinations – CIE
 Cambridge Assessment – UCLES
 Advanced/Advanced Subsidiary Level – AS/A Level
 List of Advanced Level subjects

References

External links
CIE – Official Website
CIE A Levels Subject List (those available internationally)

University of Cambridge-related lists
Secondary education-related lists
Educational qualifications in the United Kingdom
School examinations
School qualifications
Cambridge International Examinations